The men's Greco-Roman middleweight was a Greco-Roman wrestling event held as part of the Wrestling at the 1920 Summer Olympics programme. It was the third appearance of the event. Middleweight was the median category, including wrestlers weighing up to 75 kilograms.

A total of 23 wrestlers from 12 nations competed in the event, which was held from August 16 to August 20, 1920.

Results

Gold medal round

Silver medal round

Bronze medal rounds

References

External links
 
 
 

Wrestling at the 1920 Summer Olympics
Greco-Roman wrestling